This is a list of rivers of Romania which entirely or partially flow through Romania.

Longest rivers 

The length and drainage area represent only the part of the river within Romania.

References

Romania